
Janq'u Quta (Aymara janq'u white, quta lake, "white lake", Hispanicized spelling Jankho Khota, Jankho Kkota, Janko Khota, Janko Kota) is a lake in Bolivia located in the La Paz Department, Pedro Domingo Murillo Province, El Alto Municipality. It is situated south of the mountain Wayna Potosí and north-east of Milluni Lake at a height of about 4,664 metres (15,302 ft). The little lake north-east of Janq'u Quta is named Pata Quta (Pata Khota).

There is a smaller lake of the same name east of Janq'u Quta in the La Paz Municipality.

See also 
 Chacaltaya
 Laram Quta
 Milluni Peak
 Phaq'u Quta

References 

Lakes of La Paz Department (Bolivia)